Radonja is a masculine Serbian given name. It is derived from the adjective rad which means 'willing', 'eager', 'keen'. Patronymic surname Radonjić or Radončić/Radonjičić is derived from Radonja.

In the 1455 survey of the Branković district on Metohija and Kosovo there were 212 men whose name was Radonja.

People
 Nikola Radonja (fl. 1366-1399), Serbian nobleman
 Radonja Petrović (1670–1737), Serbian military leader

See also 
 Radonjić (disambiguation), surname and toponym
 Radoinja, village in western Serbia
 Radonjica, village in southern Serbia
 Radunje, village in southern Serbia
 Radunia River in Poland
 Radunia Mountain in Poland
 Radič, given name

References 

Slavic masculine given names
Serbian masculine given names
Masculine given names